Rsovci is a village 22 km from Pirot, Serbia.

History

The oldest building in this area is the Cave Church, Rsovci (Pećinska crkva), a Serbian Orthodox cave-church dedicated to St.Peter and Paul the Apostle with a unique fresco of Jesus called the Bald Jesus (ćelavi Isus) was built in the 13th century.

External links

Populated places in Pirot District